Although not unanimously accepted, the existence of the castra of Cristești in the Roman province of Dacia is substantiated by bricks and tiles bearing the name of a Roman military unit, the Ala I Gallorum et Bosporanorum. The lack of any other traces of the Roman fort may easily be due to its destruction by the Mureș River. At Cristeşti, a Roman settlement from the 2nd and 3rd centuries AD was unearthed which was an important center of potters.

See also
List of castra

Notes

External links
Roman castra from Romania - Google Maps / Earth

Roman legionary fortresses in Romania
Ancient history of Transylvania
Historic monuments in Mureș County